Leslie Fergus Patrick Aherne (born 16 March 1963) in Cork is a former Irish rugby union international player who played as a scrum-half.
He played for the Ireland team from 1988 to 1992, winning 16 caps and scoring one try. He was a member of the Ireland squad at the 1991 Rugby World Cup.

References

External links
ESPN Profile

1963 births
Living people
Irish rugby union players
Ireland international rugby union players
Rugby union players from County Cork
Rugby union scrum-halves